Bob Wilson may refer to:

Association footballers 
Bob Wilson (footballer, born 1867) (1867–?), Irish international footballer of the 1880s
Bob Wilson (footballer, born September 1898)  1920s, Scottish footballer with Third Lanark and Fall River Marksmen (USA)
Bob Wilson (footballer, born 1928) (1928–2006), English footballer for Preston North End and Tranmere Rovers
Bob Wilson (footballer, born 1934), Scottish footballer for Norwich City and Gillingham
Bob Wilson (footballer, born 1941), Scottish international football goalkeeper for Arsenal; later a broadcaster
Bob Wilson (footballer, born 1943) (1943–2020), English football goalkeeper
Bob Wilson (New Zealand footballer), New Zealand international football (soccer) player

Other sports players 
Bob Wilson (basketball) (1926–2014), American professional basketball player
Robert Wilson (rugby league) (1879–1916), English rugby player of early 20th century
Bob Wilson (rugby union) (1926–1985), Scotland international rugby union player
Bob Wilson (baseball) (1925–1985), played for the 1958 L.A. Dodgers
Bob Wilson (footballer, born 1907) (1907–1982), Australian rules footballer for Richmond 
Bob Wilson (footballer, born August 1898) (1898–1986), Australian rules footballer for Carlton
Bob Wilson (footballer, born 1945), former Australian rules footballer for Essendon
Bob Wilson (cricketer) (born 1928), English cricketer 
Bob Wilson (American football) (1913–1999), American football player
Bob Wilson (ice hockey) (born 1934), Canadian ice hockey player

Other 
Bob Wilson (cartoonist) (born 1942), British cartoonist of the Stanley Bagshaw series of children's cartoons
Bob Wilson (economist) (born 1937), American economist and professor at Stanford University
Bob Wilson (sportscaster) (1929–2015), former radio sportscaster for the Boston Bruins
Bob Wilson (politician) (1916–1999), U.S. Representative from California
Bob Wilson (singer) (born c. 1940), Californian singer-guitarist, first to record "(And Her Name Is) Scarlet" 
Robert Tudawali, Australian actor also known as Bob or Bobby Wilson
The protagonist of Robert Heinlein's science fiction story "By His Bootstraps"

See also
Bob Wilson (Fatal Fury), fictional character from the Fatal Fury series video games
"Bob Wilson - Anchorman", a 2001 song by English indie rock band Half Man Half Biscuit
Robert Wilson (disambiguation)
Bobby Wilson (disambiguation)
Bob Willson (born 1928), TV host